The Tejano Music Award for Album of the Year – Group (formerly the Tejano Music Award for Album of the Year – Orchestra from 1981 to 1997) was an honor presented to albums by Tejano music groups/bands.

Recipients

See also 

Music of Texas

References

General

Specific

External links
Official site of the Tejano Music Awards

Orchestra Album of the Year
Awards established in 1981
Awards disestablished in 2013
Album awards